In linguistics, a distinctive feature is the most basic unit of phonological structure that distinguishes one sound from another within a language. For example, the feature [voice] distinguishes the two bilabial plosives: [p] and [b]. There are many different ways of defining and arranging features into feature systems: some deal with only one language while others are developed to apply to all languages.

Distinctive features are grouped into categories according to the natural classes of segments they describe: major class features, laryngeal features, manner features, and place features. These feature categories in turn are further specified on the basis of the phonetic properties of the segments in question. For phonemes to be in a particular natural class, they have to share the same distinctive features such as articulation and/or sound similar to each other. We can find distinctive features between two words by finding the minimal pair between them. The minimal pair are when two words sound the same, but they are different in definition because the pair has different phonemes from each other.

Since the inception of the phonological analysis of distinctive features in the 1950s, features traditionally have been specified by binary values to signify whether a segment is described by the feature; a positive value, [+], denotes the presence of a feature, while a negative value, [−], indicates its absence. In addition, a phoneme may be unmarked with respect to a feature. It is also possible for certain phonemes to have different features across languages. For example,  could be classified as a continuant or not in a given language depending on how it patterns with other consonants. After the first distinctive feature theory was created by Jakobson in 1941, it was assumed that the distinctive features are binary and this theory about distinctive features being binary was formally adopted in “Sound Pattern of English” by Chomsky and Halle in 1968. Jakobson saw the binary approach as the best way to make the phoneme inventory shorter and the phonological oppositions are naturally binary.

In recent developments to the theory of distinctive features, phonologists have proposed the existence of single-valued features. These features, called univalent or privative features, can only describe the classes of segments that are said to possess those features, and not the classes that are without them.

List

This section lists and describes distinctive features in linguistics.

Major class 
Major class features: The features that represent the major classes of sounds.
[+/− syllabic] Syllabic segments may function as the nucleus of a syllable, while their counterparts, the [−syll] segments, may not. Except in the case of syllabic consonants, [+syllabic] designates all vowels, while [−syllabic] designates all consonants (including glides).
[+/− consonantal] Consonantal segments are produced with an audible constriction in the vocal tract, such as obstruents, nasals, liquids, and trills. Vowels, glides and laryngeal segments are not consonantal.
[+/− approximant] Approximant segments include vowels, glides, and liquids while excluding nasals and obstruents.
[+/− sonorant] This feature describes the type of oral constriction that can occur in the vocal tract. [+son] designates the vowels and sonorant consonants (namely glides, liquids, and nasals) that are produced without an imbalance of air pressure in the vocal tract that might cause turbulence. [−son] describes the obstruents, articulated with a noticeable turbulence caused by an imbalance of air pressure in the vocal tract.

Laryngeal
Laryngeal features: The features that specify the glottal states of sounds.
[+/− voice] This feature indicates whether vibration of the vocal folds occurs with the articulation of the segment.
[+/− spread glottis] Used to indicate the aspiration of a segment, this feature denotes the openness of the glottis. For [+sg], the vocal folds are spread apart widely enough for frication to occur; for [−sg], there is not the same friction-inducing spreading.
[+/− constricted glottis] The constricted glottis features denotes the degree of closure of the glottis. [+cg] implies that the vocal folds are held closely together, enough so that air cannot pass through momentarily, while [−cg] implies the opposite.

Manner
Manner features: The features that specify the manner of articulation.
[+/− continuant] This feature describes the passage of air through the vocal tract. [+cont] segments are produced without any significant obstruction in the tract, allowing air to pass through in a continuous stream. [−cont] segments, on the other hand, have such an obstruction, and so occlude the air flow at some point of articulation.
[+/−  nasal] This feature describes the position of the velum. [+nas] segments are produced by lowering the velum so that air can pass through the nasal tract. [−nas] segments conversely are produced with a raised velum, blocking the passage of air to the nasal tract and shunting it to the oral tract.
[+/− strident] The strident feature applies to obstruents only and refers to a type of friction that is noisier than usual. This is caused by high energy white noise.
[+/− lateral] This feature designates the shape and positioning of the tongue with respect to the oral tract. [+lat] segments are produced as the center of the tongue rises to contact the roof of the mouth, thereby blocking air from flowing centrally through the oral tract and instead forcing more lateral flow along the lowered side(s) of the tongue.
[+/− delayed release] This feature distinguishes stops from affricates. Affricates are designated [+del rel]

Place
Place features: The features that specify the place of articulation.
[ LABIAL ] Labial segments are articulated with the lips.  As consonants, these include bilabial and labiodental consonants.
[+/− round]: [+round] are produced with lip rounding, while [−round] are not.
[ CORONAL ] Coronal sounds are articulated with the tip and/or blade of the tongue. These include a large number of consonants, which can be made with the tip, blade or underside of the tongue (apical, laminal, or subapical consonant, respectively), making contact with the upper lip (linguolabial), between the teeth (interdental), with the back of the teeth (dental), with the alveolar ridge (alveolar), behind the alveolar ridge (postalveolar), or on or in front of the hard palate ((pre)palatal).  With postalveolar sibilants, additional tongue shapes need to be distinguished, i.e. "domed" or slightly palatalized ("hushing" or "palato-alveolar"), palatalized (alveolopalatal), and "closed" ("hissing-hushing").
[+/− anterior]: Anterior segments are articulated with the tip or blade of the tongue at or in front of the alveolar ridge. Dental consonants are [+ant], postalveolar and retroflex ones are [−ant].
[+/− distributed]: For [+dist] segments the tongue is extended for some distance in the mouth. In other words, laminal dental and postalveolar consonants are marked as [+dist], while apical alveolar and retroflex consonants are [−dist].
[ DORSAL ] Dorsal sounds are articulated by raising the dorsum of the tongue. All vowels are dorsal sounds. Dorsal consonants include palatal, velar and uvular consonants.
[+/− high]: [+high] segments raise the dorsum close to the palate. [−high] segments do not.
[+/− low]: [+low] segments bunch the dorsum to a position low in the mouth.
[+/− back]: [+back] segments are produced with the tongue dorsum bunched and retracted slightly to the back of the mouth. [−back] segments are bunched and extended slightly forward.
[+/− tense]: This feature (mainly) applies to the position of the root of the tongue when articulating vowels. [+tense] vowels have an advanced tongue root. In fact, this feature is often referred to as advanced tongue root (ATR), although there is a debate on whether tense and ATR are the same or different features.
[ RADICAL ] Radical sounds are articulated with the root of the tongue. These include epiglottal consonants.
[+/− advanced tongue root]: [+ATR] segments advance the root of the tongue.
[+/− retracted tongue root]: [+RTR] segments bunch the root of the tongue towards the pharyngeal wall and activate the pharyngeal constrictor muscles
[ GLOTTAL ] Purely glottal sounds do not involve the tongue at all. These are the glottal consonants.

Vowel space
Vowels are distinguished by 
[+/− back] (back vowels)
[+/− high] (close vowels)
[+/− low] (low vowels)
[+/− tense] (tense vowels)

However, laryngoscopic studies suggest the features are
[+/− front] (front vowels)
[+/− raised] (raised vowels)
[+/− retracted] (retracted vowels)
[+/− round] (round vowels)

Jakobsonian system

Sonority
[+/− vocalic] vocalic, non-vocalic
[+/− consonantal] consonantal, non-consonantal
[+/− nasal] nasal, oral
[+/− compact] forward-flanged: velar and palatal consonant, wide vowel
[+/− diffuse] backward-flanged: labial and coronal, narrow vowel
[+/− abrupt]
[+/− strident] strident, mellow
[+/− checked]

Protensity
[+/− tense]

Tonality

 [+/− grave] peripheral consonant, back vowel
 [+/− acute]
 [+/− medial] coronal or palatal consonant, front vowel
 [+/− flat] narrowed slit, wider slit
 [+/− sharp] widened slit, narrower slit

Other uses
The concept of a distinctive feature matrix to distinguish similar elements is identified with phonology, but there have been at least two efforts to use a distinctive feature matrix in related fields. Close to phonology, and clearly acknowledging its debt to phonology, distinctive features have been used to describe and differentiate handshapes in fingerspelling in American Sign Language. Distinctive features have also been used to distinguish proverbs from other types of language such as slogans, clichés, and aphorisms.

Analogous feature systems are also used throughout Natural Language Processing (NLP). For example, part-of-speech tagging divides words into categories. These include "major" categories such as Noun vs. Verb, but also other dimensions such as person and number, plurality, tense, and others. Some mnemonics for part-of-speech tags conjoin multiple features, such as "NN" for singular noun, vs. "NNS" for plural noun, vs. "NNS$" for plural possessive noun (see Brown Corpus). Others provide more explicit separation of features, even formalizing them via markup such as the Text Encoding Initiative's feature structures. Modern statistical NLP uses vectors of very many features, although many of those features are not formally "distinctive" in the sense described here.

See also
 Feature geometry

References

Sources

Phonology